USS Suzanne (SP-510) was a United States Navy patrol vessel in commission from 1917 to 1918.
 
Suzanne was built as the private motor yacht Cristina in 1908 by George Lawley & Son at Neponset, Massachusetts, for Frederick C. Fletcher of Boston, Massachusetts. She later was renamed Esperanza, then Jorosa, and then Suzanne.

On 18 May 1917, the U.S. Navy acquired Suzanne from her owner – by then F. M. Kirby of Wilkes-Barre, Pennsylvania – for use as a section patrol boat during World War I. She was commissioned as USS Suzanne (SP-510) the same day.

Assigned to the 4th Naval District, Suzanne served on patrol duties there for the remainder of World War I.

Suzanne was stricken from the Navy List on 28 December 1918 and returned to Kirby the same day. She resumed private service as Suzanne until 1938, when she was sold to J. P. Bushong of Sault Ste. Marie, Michigan, and renamed Cristina. She later operated under the names Old Horse Eye and Jo Ho.

References

NavSource Online: Section Patrol Craft Photo Archive: Suzanne (SP 510)

External links
 Photo

Patrol vessels of the United States Navy
World War I patrol vessels of the United States
Ships built in Boston
1908 ships
Individual yachts